7 Pashons - Coptic calendar - 9 Pashons

Fixed commemorations
All fixed commemorations below are observed on 8 Pashons (16 May) by the Coptic Orthodox Church.

Saints
Saint John of Senhout
Saint Daniel, the Archpriest of Scetes

Days of the Coptic calendar